Sucker Creek may refer to:
In Ontario, Canada
Sucker Creek (Osborne Township), in geographic Osborne Township, Nipissing District
In Minnesota, United States
Sucker Creek (Crow River)
Big Sucker Creek

See also
Sucker Creek Cree First Nation, in Alberta
Sucker Creek 23, Reserve in Ontario
Sucker Creek Landing, a community in the municipality of French River, Ontario
Sucker Creek Formation
Sucker Brook (disambiguation)